Goan Vindaloo or vindalho is an Indian curry dish, which is originally from Goa, based on the Portuguese dish carne de vinha d'alhos. It is known globally in its British Indian form as a staple of curry house and Indian restaurant menus, and is often regarded as a fiery, spicy dish. The traditional recipe uses pork, but alternative versions have been prepared with beef, mutton, prawns, chicken, lamb, vegetables, and tofu.

History
A standard element of Goan cuisine derived from the Portuguese carne de vinha d'alhos (literally "meat in garlic marinade"), a vindaloo is a dish of meat (usually pork) marinated in vinegar and garlic. The basic structure of the Portuguese dish was the Portuguese sailor's "preserved" raw ingredients, packed in wooden barrels of alternate layers of pork and garlic, and soaked in red wine. This was adapted by the local Goan cooks with the substitution of palm vinegar for the red wine, and the addition of spices. It evolved into the localized and easy-to-pronounce dish "vindaloo". 

The British Indian version of vindaloo calls for the meat to be marinated in vinegar, sugar, fresh ginger and spices, then cooked with more spices.

Traditional Goan preparation and Indian variations
Restaurants in Goa offering traditional Goan cuisine prepare vindalho with pork, which is the original recipe. Christians from Kochi, Kerala prepare using pork or beef, the former being more widely consumed and made. The dish was popularized by Goan cooks (whom the British favoured, because they had no issues in kitchens and bars when handling beef, pork or alcohol) in the British establishments and the ocean-going liners. Restaurants in other parts of India prepare vindalho with other meats (like beef (second most popular), chicken or goat meat or lamb) or even seafood because of local taboos against pork, and these meats are sometimes mixed with cubed potatoes to reduce preparation costs. Even though the word aloo (आलू) means potato in Hindi, traditional Goan vindalho does not include any potatoes, as the name is a corruption of a Portuguese phrase with no Hindi etymology.

Some Indian versions do include potatoes due to the confusion with the Hindi.

Outside India

Vindaloo has gained popularity outside of India, where it is almost universally featured on menus at Indian restaurants. Vindaloo served in restaurants of the United Kingdom differs from the original vindaloo dish; it is simply a spicier version of the standard "medium (spiciness)" restaurant curry with the addition of vinegar, potatoes and chili peppers. 

Vindaloo is one of the spiciest dishes available on British Asian menus where it is served, although British Bangladeshi restaurants have innovated the tindaloo, which is a quite different dish that originated in Bangladesh. The British variation originated from British Bangladeshi restaurants in the 1970s. Vindaloo is considered a predecessor to phall.

See also 
List of topics on the Portuguese Empire in the East

References

External links
 Vindaloo at The Foods of England

Anglo-Indian cuisine
Goan cuisine
Portuguese fusion cuisine
Indian cuisine in the United Kingdom